Santa Fe Springs, California has been home to two regional malls and one open-air shopping center, anchored by department stores.

Santa Fe Springs Mall

The former  Santa Fe Springs Mall, built in 1985 as a regional mall which included a Sears (relocated to Whittwood Mall in 1996) and an 8-screen Mann multicinema, is now the site of the Gateway Plaza power center, anchored by Target, Ross Dress for Less (formerly OfficeMax and Marshalls), El Super (formerly Gigante), Walmart, and L.A. Fitness. This mall is located on Telegraph Road at the intersection of Carmenita Road.

Whittier Downs

Whittier Downs Shopping Center was a  shopping center that served the community of West Whittier-Los Nietos, California from the 1950s through the 1980s, anchored by J. C. Penney. The center is at Washington and Norwalk boulevards and within the city limits of Santa Fe Springs. Pereira & Luckman were the architects.

The center opened in 1955 with parking for 740 cars. Unusually, shops faced both a pedestrian mall as well as the parking lot.

In the late 1980s, the mall was demolished and the site was redeveloped into the Santa Fe Springs Marketplace, a neighborhood center anchored by a Food 4 Less supermarket and large Rite Aid pharmacy (formerly Thrifty Drugs).

Santa Fe Springs Shopping Center

The former Santa Fe Springs Shopping Center opened in 1954 with W. T. Grant, Market Basket and David's Department Store, is now called a neighborhood shopping center, Santa Fe Springs Promenade, with  The dedication of a 40-foot-tall sign spelling out "Santa Fe Springs" at the center in 1956 was the celebrated with a three-day city festival.

References

Demolished shopping malls in the United States
Shopping malls in Southeast Los Angeles County, California
Santa Fe Springs, California
History of Los Angeles County, California